Aa mandonii is a species of orchid in the genus Aa.

References

mandonii
Plants described in 1912